David Toivo Teivonen (6 June 1889 – 1937) was a Finnish gymnast who competed at the 1908 Summer Olympics.

Gymnastics 

He was part of the Viipurin Reipas team that won the gymnastics Finnish national championship in 1906.

Biography 

He received the Mercantile Marine War Medal.

He moved to Soviet Union and became its citizen in 1937. He died that year.

Sources

References 

1937 deaths
1889 births
Finnish male artistic gymnasts
Olympic gymnasts of Finland
Gymnasts at the 1908 Summer Olympics
People from Viipuri Province (Grand Duchy of Finland)
Finnish emigrants to the Soviet Union
20th-century Finnish people